The Union of Independent Trade Unions (USI) is a national trade union center in Portugal founded on 18 November 2000. It is composed of 14 trade unions from the public services, banking, transport and energy sectors.

References

Trade unions in Portugal
Trade unions established in 2000